Hammergraben is a river of Brandenburg, Germany. It branches off the Spree in Cottbus, and flows into the Großes Fließ (a tributary of the Spree) in Schmogrow-Fehrow. It is used to flood Cottbuser Ostsee, a former open pit lignite mine, which is planned to become Germany's largest artificial lake by surface area.

See also
List of rivers of Brandenburg

Rivers of Brandenburg
Rivers of Germany